The 1956 West Virginia Mountaineers football team represented West Virginia University as a member of the Southern Conference (SoCon) during the 1956 NCAA University Division football season. Led by seventh-year head coach Art Lewis, the Mountaineers compiled an overall record of 6–4 with a mark of 5–0 in conference play, winning the SoCon title for the fourth consecutive season.

Schedule

References

West Virginia
West Virginia Mountaineers football seasons
Southern Conference football champion seasons
West Virginia Mountaineers football